Quds-1, designated '351' by the US Government, is a land-attack cruise missile used by Houthi movement in Yemen. The Houthis claim that they have developed it themselves, but some sources disagree.

Design
According to missile expert Fabian Hinz it could be a copy of the Iranian Soumar missile or the Russian Kh-55. However, the size of the missile is smaller than the Iranian one, and its range is much shorter due to having less room aboard for fuel, and due to being a ground-launched rather than an air-launched cruise missile. He added that there are differences between the Soumar missile and the Quds-1 missile like "the entire booster design, the wing position, the Quds 1's fixed wings, the shape of the nose cone, the shape of the aft fuselage, the position of the stabilizers and the shape of the engine cover and exhaust". According to Fabian Hinz the range of Quds-1 is "significantly" smaller than the Iranian Soumar.

The primary engine is an unlicensed copy of the TJ-100 turbojet produced by PBS Velká Bíteš in Czechia. The UN Final report of the Panel of Experts on Yemen was released on 27th January 2020:

 It uses the TERCOM navigation system.

A "Quds cruise missile" was amongst the long-range unmanned aerial vehicles (UAV) the Houthis displayed to the media in July 2019. Jane's Defence Weekly described it as shorter with differently shaped wings and fins, engine mounted on top rather than inside, and a smaller rocket launch booster compared to the Iranian Ya Ali. The fins looked similar to the missile used in the Abha International Airport attack the previous month.

Quds-2 
The Quds-2 cruise missile is also used by Yemen, and is supposed to be a more advanced version of the Quds-1, with higher speed, and range.

Quds-3

See also
Houthi insurgency in Yemen
Saudi Arabian-led intervention in Yemen

References

Surface-to-surface missiles of Yemen
Cruise missiles